Aşk Fırtınası is a 1972 Turkish romantic drama film, directed by Halit Refiğ and starring Kartal Tibet, Bahar Erdeniz, and Muzaffer Tema.

References

External links
Aşk Fırtınası at the Internet Movie Database

1972 films
Turkish romantic drama films
1972 romantic drama films
Films directed by Halit Refiğ